Menteroda is a village and a former municipality in the Unstrut-Hainich-Kreis district of Thuringia, Germany. On 1 January 2023 it became part of the municipality Unstruttal.

History
Within the German Empire (1870-1918), Menteroda was part of the Duchy of Saxe-Coburg and Gotha.

References

External links
 

Unstrut-Hainich-Kreis
Saxe-Coburg and Gotha
Former municipalities in Thuringia